Moorthiambalpuram is a village in the Orathanadu taluk of Thanjavur district, Tamil Nadu, India.

Demographics 

As per the 2001 census, Moorthiambalpuram had a total population of 907 with 435 males and 472 females. The sex ratio was 1085. The literacy rate was 56.64.

References 

 

Villages in Thanjavur district